Marcia Judith Freedman (née Prince; May 17, 1938 – September 21, 2021) was an American-Israeli activist on behalf of peace, women's rights, and gay rights. In 1969, she immigrated to Israel where she helped establish and lead the feminist movement in the 1970s. She was a member of the Knesset from 1974 to 1977.

Biography
Born in to a Jewish family in Newark, New Jersey on May 17, 1938, Freedman received a BA from Bennington College and an MA from New York University. She was active in the American Civil Rights Movement between 1960 and 1967. In 1969 she immigrated to Israel, and soon became involved in activism and politics. She became famous from her desire to modify abortion laws and raise awareness to the civil rights movement.

In 1973, the feminist movement decided to support Shulamit Aloni's Ratz (the Civil Rights Movement), and Freedman was given third place on the Ratz slate. She caught Shulamit Aloni's attention based on her passion, commitment, and enthusiasm for the movement. Aloni asked Freedman to be the third seat on the party. The party won three seats in the 1973 Israeli legislative election, and Freedman became a member of the Knesset. Ratz soon merged into Ya'ad – Civil Rights Movement, but Freedman and Aryeh Eliav broke away to form the Social-Democratic Faction (later renamed the Independent Socialist Faction). Freedman served in the Knesset from 1974 to 1977. She became a strong advocate for Gay Rights movements because she came out as a lesbian to her daughter and her daughter started to isolate from her.

Prior to the 1977 elections Freedman formed the Women's Party, though she did not stand as its candidate. The party failed to cross the 1% electoral threshold though it did succeed in attracting public support for women's issues. While a member of the Knesset, Freedman was outspoken on women's issues and brought to public attention issues that had never been discussed publicly in Israel, including domestic violence, breast cancer, rape, incest, and teenage prostitution. In addition, Freedman became increasingly involved with the discussion on peace with the Palestinians. However, in her interview in 2015 with the American Jewish Peace Archive, she stated that she "was drawn into what I would call foreign policy issues because I was a member of Knesset, and that was totally accidental and unplanned" (about her involvement with the Palestinian conflict). Freedman was an early supporter of the creation of a Palestinian independent state. She was involved in communications with the Palestinian Liberation Organization and supported what is now known as the two-state solution.

Freedman helped create an advocacy and support network for women in Israel. She was a co-founder, together with Barbara Swersky and others of Israel's first shelter for battered women, established in 1977 in Haifa. Freedman left Israel and returned to the United States in 1981. She again lived in Israel from 1997 to 2002, and founded the Community of Learning Women, which provided education in women's studies and computer literacy.

Freedman wrote an article titled "Feminist Publishing in Israel" for the Women's Studies Newsletter in 1980. She spoke about different bookstores involving feminist books in Hebrew and the six publishers that allows feminist works to be published. She also spoke about how few books on feminism were originally written in Hebrew and the minimal efforts there were to publish feminist writings.

Freedman wrote a memoir entitled, Exile in the Promised Land, and was dedicated to her father. She stated on the dedication page, "whose example I have largely followed." She was also the author of many articles and reviews.

Freedman was the founding president of Brit Tzedek v'Shalom, a pro-Israel and pro-peace organization which merged into J Street in 2010. She was also a past president of the San Francisco Jewish Film Festival.

She was married to Bill Freedman in 1961, and had one daughter. Freedman died on September 21, 2021 at the age of 83. As of 2021, she remains the only openly lesbian woman to have served in the Knesset.

See also
 List of peace activists

References

Further reading

External links
Marcia Freedman papers held by Robert D. Farber University Archives and Special Collections at Brandeis University
Digital exhibit on the Marcia Freedman papers held by Robert D. Farber University Archives and Special Collections at Brandeis University
Brit Tzedek v'Shalom legacy website
Memorial for Marcia Freedman Sinai Memorial Chapel, San Francisco

1938 births
2021 deaths
American Jews
American feminists
American Zionists
Israeli feminists
Jewish feminists
Jewish socialists
Jewish women politicians
Members of the 8th Knesset (1974–1977)
American emigrants to Israel
Women members of the Knesset
Pacifist feminists
Lesbian Jews
LGBT members of the Knesset
Israeli anti-war activists
Writers from Newark, New Jersey
Ratz (political party) politicians
Ya'ad – Civil Rights Movement politicians
Independent Socialist Faction politicians
Lesbian politicians
Lesbian memoirists
Israeli lesbian writers
American lesbian writers
LGBT people from New Jersey
Women's Party (Israel) politicians
American women memoirists
American memoirists
Bennington College alumni
New York University alumni
American civil rights activists
Jewish Israeli politicians
Jewish women activists